Michael Anthony Jordan (born 17 February 1958) is a British racing driver who competed in various classes of saloon and sportscar racing. He has won three British titles and spent three years competing in the BTCC against many drivers less than half his age, including his son and teammate Andrew. In 2006 he became the oldest driver ever to win a BTCC race. He lives in Lichfield with his wife Judith and their three children.

Racing career
Born in Sutton Coldfield, Jordan started racing in the late 1970s with a Morris Minor in the Classic Saloon Car Club's Pre-57 road-going championship, which he won in 1979. He bought the car from a workmate with bank loans and drove it on the road. His first BTCC appearances were in 1989 in a Peugeot.

He was Porsche Cup champion in 1987 and 1991. He then competed in saloon cars and won the Willhire 24 Hour race in 1992 and 1993, also finishing runner up in the 1992 ESSO Group N Saloon Car Championship.

In the mighty V8 Eurocar racing saloons he was champion in 1996 and 1997 and then moved to the TVR Tuscan Challenge, twice finishing runner up in the championship.

GT Racing
In 2000, he teamed up with Mark Sumpter to race a Porsche GT3R in the GTO division of the British GT Championship, supporting Mark to the title. Mike then jumped into the top class of the British GT championship to race a thundering Lister Storm with David Warnock. Despite fierce opposition, they won the title in 2001 and finished second the following season. Mike also made his FIA GT championship with Lister in 2001, winning outright at Nurburgring when partnering Jamie Campbell-Walter.

In 2002, he also competed with Mark in the Daytona 24 Hours, finishing the race at their first attempt. For 2003, Mike once again teamed up with Mark Sumpter to compete in the FIA GT championship alongside teammates Godfrey and David Jones.

For 2004 and 2005, he returned to the British GT Championship, winning races in 2004 with Sumpter and leading the chase of the Ferraris in 2005 when partnered by former TVR Tuscan rival Michael Caine.

BTCC

In 2006, Jordan returned to the British Touring Car Championship in an ex-Team Dynamics Honda Integra ran by his Eurotech Racing team. Jordan broke a BTCC record at Mondello Park by taking his first and only BTCC race win. By taking the win, he became the championship's oldest ever race winner at the age of 48.
His season finished badly after contact with James Thompson caused him to crash heavily, causing him to spend a few days in hospital.

Racing record

Complete British GT Championship results
(key) (Races in bold indicate pole position) (Races in italics indicate fastest lap)

Complete British Touring Car Championship results
(key) Races in bold indicate pole position (1 point awarded – 2006–2008 just in first race, 1989 in class) Races in italics indicate fastest lap (1 point awarded – 1989, 2006–2008 all races, 1989 in class)  * signifies that driver lead race for at least one lap (1 point awarded all races 2006 onwards)

References

External links
Team Eurotech
Profile at BTCCPages.com

British Touring Car Championship drivers
1958 births
Living people
English racing drivers
Sportspeople from Sutton Coldfield
24 Hours of Le Mans drivers
British GT Championship drivers
European Le Mans Series drivers
Blancpain Endurance Series drivers
24 Hours of Spa drivers
Britcar 24-hour drivers
Sports car racing team owners
ASCAR drivers
Team West-Tec drivers